A Man and the Blues is the second studio album by blues guitarist Buddy Guy. It was recorded and released in 1968 on Vanguard Records. It features four Guy originals, a cover of Barrett Strong's Tamla Motown hit "Money", and a playful adaptation of the nursery rhyme "Mary Had a Little Lamb", covered in a similar fashion by Stevie Ray Vaughan in the 1980s.

Track listing

Personnel
 Buddy Guy - lead guitar, lead vocals
 Otis Spann - piano
 Wayne Bennett - rhythm guitar
 Jack Myers - bass guitar
 Donald Hankins, Aaron Corthen, Bobby Fields - saxophones
 Lonny Taylor, Fred Below - drums, percussion
Technical
Fred Holtz - cover design
Lee Tanner - photography

References

Buddy Guy albums
Vanguard Records albums
1968 albums
Albums produced by Samuel Charters